Baybolovka is a rural locality (a village) in Kukushtanskoye Rural Settlement, Permsky District, Perm Krai, Russia. The population was 808 as of 2010. There are 17 streets.

Geography 
Baybolovka is located 55 km south of Perm (the district's administrative centre) by road. Sukho-Platoshino is the nearest rural locality.

References 

Rural localities in Permsky District